Hønefoss Church is a church in the Ringerike municipality in Viken county, Norway. The historic wooden church burned down to the ground on 26 January 2010. The new replacement church was constructed on site and opened during 2017.

History
In 1858, church architect Christian Heinrich Grosch was hired to draw plans for the church. the inauguration took place on 10 December 1862. The church received a new chapel, which was dedicated in 1894. The church was restored shortly after 1950 and stood ready for the reopening in 1952.

The church had room for approximately 350 people. It was located in Hønefoss, which is the administrative center of the Ringerike municipality. The church had its own cemetery, burial chapel, crematorium and a modern assembly room (referred to as Kirkestua).

Fire

The fire department in Ringerike received the notification that Hønefoss Church was on fire just before at 5:00 pm Tuesday 26 January 2010. Shortly afterwards the church burned down, and it soon became clear that the building could not be repaired. The  church tower collapsed around 6:00 pm.
In November 2009 it had been discovered that there were twelve faults in the electrical system of the church, and the police investigation concluded that faulty contact in a cable for the electric heating ovens was indeed the cause of the fire.

References

External links
Hønefoss Kirke website
Historic Hønefoss Church 
Hønefoss kirke (LINK arkitektur)

Churches in Viken
2010 in Norway
1862 establishments in Norway
Ringerike (municipality)
Burned buildings and structures